Beyond Hatred is a 2005 French documentary film written and directed by Olivier Meyrou.

The documentary tells the story of a French couple seeking justice and feeling acceptance after the homophobic murder of their gay son, 29-year-old Francois Chenu. He was murdered by three white power skinheads in 2002, who beat him severely in the face and threw him into a pond. The attackers were arrested one month after the incident, and Meyrou read about the case on the front page of Le Monde. He had been wanting to make a film about homophobia for some time, and decided that the Chenu case was very emblematic.

The film's French television premiere was on 19 June 2005; Eurozoom distributed the film's French theatrical release the following year. It was shown at the 2006 Berlin International Film Festival, the Paris Gay and Lesbian Film Festival, and the 2007 London Lesbian and Gay Film Festival. It had a limited theatrical release in the United States on 15 June 2007, distributed by First Run Features.

Rotten Tomatoes gave Beyond Hatred a "fresh" rating of 89% based on 18 reviews. Metacritic gave it a "generally favorable" rating of 65% based on five reviews. The documentary won the Teddy Award for Best Documentary at the 2006 Berlin Film Festival.

Notes

External links
 
 

2005 films
French documentary films
2000s French-language films
French LGBT-related films
2005 documentary films
Documentary films about violence against LGBT people
Violence against gay men
Works about white nationalism
2005 directorial debut films
2005 LGBT-related films
2000s French films